WNDH (103.1 FM) is a radio station broadcasting a classic hits format. Licensed to Napoleon, Ohio, United States, the station is currently owned by iHeartMedia, Inc.

WNDH began broadcasting in 1972 and originally featured a beautiful music format, which has been updated over the years to an adult contemporary sound.  The station switched to Clear Channel's Classic Hits format in early September 2014, with the former AC format moving to sister station 98.1 WDFM. The station's coverage area in Northwest Ohio includes the cities of Defiance, Bryan, and Wauseon, in addition to Napoleon.

Broadcast tower
The WNDH broadcast tower is located near the intersection of County Road J and Township Road 15 in Flatrock Township in Henry County, Ohio. Its coordinates are 41.3, -84.156111.

Programming
WNDH is affiliated with IHeartRadio, NBC News Radio and features a classic hits format. WNDH also broadcasts Ohio State Buckeyes football and men's basketball, as well as local high school football, basketball, baseball, and other various local events in Henry County and Northwest Ohio.

References

External links

NDH
Classic hits radio stations in the United States
Radio stations established in 1972
IHeartMedia radio stations